City Brain (sometimes treated as an improper noun by sources and rendered as city brain) is a software system that utilizes artificial intelligence and data collection for urban management. Developed by Chinese tech company Alibaba Group, the City Brain systems have been adopted by local governments throughout the country as well as in Kuala Lumpur, the capital of Malaysia. Currently, these systems are mostly used for traffic management, but they have been used and expanded to cover other needs as well. City Brain systems have been promoted as making cities "smarter" and improving their residents' quality of life. However, the systems have also faced criticism for issues relating to privacy, cost, and their use of surveillance.

History and overview 
The first City Brain system was announced and developed in 2016 by Alibaba Cloud for its home city of Hangzhou. First aiming to curb the city's high level of traffic congestion, it was initially "given control" of traffic lights in Xiaoshan District, where it increased traffic speed by 15%. This led to its adoption by the rest of the city in 2017, where it has seen praise for continuing to reduce congestion and aiding first responders to travel faster. In addition to traffic light management, the system also analyzes camera feeds to detect accidents and alert authorities.  In the following years, many other local governments in China sought their own such systems. In addition, Kuala Lumpur, the capital of Malaysia, announced its adoption of a City Brain system in 2018 to deal with traffic. By September 2019, Alibaba stated that 22 Chinese cities, including Macau, as well as Kuala Lumpur, had City Brain systems. The scope of these systems has expanded, with some being used to track pollution, alert authorities to illegal gatherings and possible conflicts of interest/corruption in government outsourcing, and aid in contact tracing during the COVID-19 pandemic. Some commentators criticized this rapid adoption, pointing out the high cost of the system (often in the range of hundreds of millions of renminbi), questing their usability, especially for smaller communities, and asking if they could be trusted with city residents' personal data and information. Further attention has been brought to issues of privacy, with concerns being brought up over data harvesting, the use of surveillance, and issues with oversight and possible data breaches.

References

External links 
 

Smart cities